Imbabura Sporting Club is a professional football club based in Ibarra, Ecuador.

Achievements
Serie B (1): 2006 E2
Segunda Categoría (1): 1995

Current squad

World Cup players
The following players were chosen to represent their country at the FIFA World Cup while contracted to Imbabura.

 Kevin Rodríguez (2022)

External links
Official website 

Association football clubs established in 1993
Football clubs in Ecuador
1993 establishments in Ecuador